The Arvandan Stadium is a stadium in Khorramshahr, Iran.  It is currently used for football matches.

References

Football venues in Iran
Sports venues completed in 2016
2016 establishments in Iran